Tamara Pavlovna Garkushina (born 1 February 1946) is a retired Russian track cyclist who won six world titles in the 3 km individual pursuit, in 1967 and 1970–1974. She also won more than 30 national titles in the individual and team pursuit events in 1966–1976.

Garkushina was born in a working-class family in a small village in Lipetsk Oblast. After moving to Tula, she graduated with a degree of house painter and decorator and practiced this profession first in Tula (1963–1964) and then in Irkutsk (1964–1965); in parallel, she trained in cycling. After retiring from competition, she worked as a post office clerk (1980–1982) and then as a cycling coach (1982–1985). From 1985 till retirement in 1993 she worked at machinery plants in Tula. In 2010, she became an honorary citizen of the city.

References 

1946 births
Living people
Russian female cyclists
Soviet female cyclists
People from Yeletsky District
UCI Track Cycling World Champions (women)
Russian track cyclists
Sportspeople from Lipetsk Oblast